Joop Demmenie (19 December 1918 – 3 June 1991) was a road cyclist from Netherlands. After he finished fourth in the amateur road race at the 1937 UCI Road World Championships, he won the bronze medal at the 1938 UCI Road World Championships in the men's amateur road race. He was a professional cyclist between 1939 and 1948. In 1939 he won Brussel-Hozémont.

References

External links
 profile at Cyclingarchives.com

1918 births
1991 deaths
Dutch male cyclists
Cyclists from Rotterdam
UCI Road World Championships cyclists for the Netherlands
20th-century Dutch people